Hakkari or Hakkâri may refer to: 

Hakkari (historical region), a historical region in modern-day Turkey and Iraq
Hakkâri (city), a city and the capital of Hakkâri Province, Turkey
Hakkâri Province, a province in southeast Turkey
Hakkari (electoral district), an electoral district Grand National Assembly of Turkey
Emirate of Hakkâri, a historical Kurdish emirate